Rain is a municipality  in the district of Straubing-Bogen in Bavaria, Germany. Former head of state of Hungary, Archduke Joseph August of Austria died here in 1962.

References

Straubing-Bogen